Silver Lining is the second EP by French metalcore band Betraying the Martyrs. It was released on 24 June 2022 through Out of Line Music. The EP is the band's first release with vocalist Rui Martins. It is also their first release with the label.

Background and recording
On 12 October 2021, Betraying the Martyrs announced that they had parted ways with Sumerian Records and signed with Out of Line Music, and welcomed their new vocalist Rui Martins to the band. At the same time, they released the first single "Black Hole" along with a corresponding music video. On 3 November, the band began working on new material for the forthcoming release. 15 November, they have concluded the recording sessions for their new EP. On 1 May 2022, Betraying the Martyrs revealed the EP itself, the EP cover, the track list, and release date.

Critical reception

The EP received generally positive reviews from critics. Wall of Sound gave the album a score 9.5/10 and saying: "Betraying the Martyrs have unleashed an almost perfect metalcore release. It has everything you want from the genre with tight musicianship, complex layering and riffs aplenty. They've also scored a new frontman who delivers all the right emotions and heaviness this band so rightfully deserves. The tracklisting flows like a river and my only gripe is that it isn't longer. If this is just a taste of what's to come, sign me the F**k up for life!"

Track listing

Personnel
Betraying the Martyrs
 Rui Martins – lead vocals
 Steeves Hostin – lead guitar
 Baptiste Vigier – rhythm guitar
 Valentin Hauser – bass
 Boris le Gal – drums
 Victor Guillet – keyboards, clean vocals

References

2022 EPs
Betraying the Martyrs albums
Out of Line Music albums